This is a list of butterflies that are found in Iowa.

References

Iowa
Butterflies